Friedhof Trenkebergstraße  is a cemetery in Cologne, Germany. The cemetery is 4,600 m2 and offers space for 790 graves. Furthermore, there are 16 graves in this cemetery for German victims of the Second World War.

References

Cemeteries in Cologne